Voyage of the Golden Dragon is an adventure module for the 3.5 edition of the Dungeons & Dragons fantasy role-playing game.

Plot summary
Voyage of the Golden Dragon takes place in the Eberron setting. The player characters must protect the Golden Dragon - once a skyfaring warship, now a symbol of peace among the Five Nations of Khorvaire - on its maiden voyage as pirates, thieves, and saboteurs conspire to defame, steal, or destroy it.

Publication history
Voyage of the Golden Dragon was written by Nicolas Logue, and was published in April 2006. Cover art was by Wayne Reynolds, with interior art by Steve Prescott.

Reception

External links
product info

References

Eberron adventures
Role-playing game supplements introduced in 2006